The 1953–54 Bulgarian Hockey League season was the third season of the Bulgarian Hockey League, the top level of ice hockey in Bulgaria. Seven teams participated in the league, and HK Udarnik Sofia won the championship.

Standings

External links
 Season on hockeyarchives.info

Bul
Bulgarian Hockey League seasons
Bulg